Pierre Dondelinger (29 January 1913 – 12 April 2000) was a French sprinter. He competed in the men's 200 metres at the 1936 Summer Olympics.

Competition record

References

1913 births
2000 deaths
Athletes (track and field) at the 1936 Summer Olympics
French male sprinters
Olympic athletes of France
Place of birth missing
20th-century French people